This list includes properties and districts listed on the California Historical Landmark listing in Colusa County, California, United States. Click the "Map of all coordinates" link to the right to view a Google map of all properties and districts with latitude and longitude coordinates in the table below.

|}

References

See also

List of California Historical Landmarks
National Register of Historic Places listings in Colusa County, California

  
 

+Landmarks
List of California Historical Landmarks